Latina was an American lifestyle, entertainment, beauty and fashion magazine for bilingual Hispanic women published in English by Latina Media Ventures.

In May 2010, Latina Media Ventures named editorial director Galina Espinoza and publisher Lauren Michaels co-presidents of the company. Latina was named to Adweek's "Hot List" in 2000 and 2001 and named Best Magazine by Advertising Age in 2000.

History
Today, Latina aspires to be a space for the "Latinx community, regardless of identity." Latina was founded in 1996 by Christy Haubegger under Latina Publications, LLC. Haubegger, then a 28-year-old Stanford Law School graduate. The first issue featured Jennifer Lopez on the cover. In 2000, the company changed its name to Latina Media Ventures, LLC. Haubegger now works at Creative Artists Agency and remains a member of the board for Latina Media Ventures. The magazine had an audience of approximately 3 million and was named Best Magazine by Advertising Age in 2000.

Latina provides knowledge of their culture, politics, and entertainment with the latest news, such as Celebrate Ellen Ochoa, the first Latina in space and NASA trailblazer. A category for self-love, healing, community, etc.  The magazine's covers consistently featured prominent Latinas like Jennifer Lopez, Selena Gomez, Paulina Rubio, Jessica Alba, Shakira, Eva Longoria, Salma Hayek, Eva Mendes, Christina Aguilera, Naya Rivera, America Ferrera and Supreme Court Justice Sonia Sotomayor. The November 2015 issue featured girl group Fifth Harmony, whose three out of five members are Latinas, marking the first time two non-Latinas were featured on the cover of the magazine.

Latina Media Ventures faced accusations in 2017 of not paying its staff in nearly a month. This year the publisher also laid-off six of its thirty employees, was behind its production schedule, and had its account frozen by Citibank. In 2018 amidst payroll problems, Robyn Moreno co-president of Latina Media Ventures resigned.

See also

People en Español
Hispanic
Dolores Prida

References

External links

"Check Out Naya Rivera on Latina Magazine's May 2012 Cover!". April 3, 2012.
"Fifth Harmony for Latina Magazine, November 2015 Cover."

Cultural magazines published in the United States
Defunct women's magazines published in the United States
Magazines disestablished in 2018
Magazines established in 1996
Women's fashion magazines
Magazines published in New York City